Red Arch Mountain is a  elevation Navajo Sandstone summit located in Zion National Park, in Washington County of southwest Utah, United States.

Description
It is set on the east side of the North Fork Virgin River which drains precipitation runoff from this mountain. Its neighbors include Mount Majestic, Cathedral Mountain, The Great White Throne, Mountain of the Sun, Mount Moroni, and Lady Mountain. This mountain's descriptive name was officially adopted in 1934 by the U.S. Board on Geographic Names. It is so named for a blind arch that formed in 1880 on the northwest face when a rock avalanche fell into the valley. This event buried the Gifford farm in rubble. It happened on a Sunday when the family was away at church in Springdale.

Climate
Spring and fall are the most favorable seasons to visit Red Arch Mountain. According to the Köppen climate classification system, it is located in a Cold semi-arid climate zone, which is defined by the coldest month having an average mean temperature below , and at least 50% of the total annual precipitation being received during the spring and summer.

Gallery

See also

 List of mountains in Utah
 Geology of the Zion and Kolob canyons area
 Colorado Plateau

References

External links

 Zion National Park National Park Service
 Weather forecast: Red Arch Mountain
 Red Arch Mountain rock climbing: Mountainproject.com

Mountains of Utah
Zion National Park
Mountains of Washington County, Utah
Sandstone formations of the United States
Colorado Plateau